Glyphidoptera is a genus of moths belonging to the subfamily Tortricinae of the family Tortricidae.

Species
Glyphidoptera insignana (Meyrick, 1881)
Glyphidoptera polymita Turner, 1916

See also
List of Tortricidae genera

References

External links
tortricidae.com

Archipini
Tortricidae genera